Hans Marr (born Johann Julius Richter; 22 July 1878 – 21 March 1949) was a German actor.

Selected filmography
 The Black Hand (1917)
 The Wandering Image (1920)
 The Adventure of Doctor Kircheisen (1920)
 Steuermann Holk (1920)
 To the Ladies' Paradise (1922)
 William Tell (1923)
 Paradise in the Snow (1923)
 Felicitas Grolandin (1923)
 The Moon of Israel (1924)
 The Arsonists of Europe (1926)
 Grandstand for General Staff (1926)
 The White Paradise (1929)
 Seafaring Is Necessary (1921)
 Grand Duchess Alexandra (1933)
 Der Musikant von Eisenstadt (1934)
 William Tell (1934)
 Nocturne (1934)
 The Immortal Song (1934)

Bibliography
 Jung, Uli & Schatzberg, Walter. Beyond Caligari: The Films of Robert Wiene. Berghahn Books, 1999.

External links

1878 births
1949 deaths
People from the Province of Silesia
Actors from Wrocław
German male film actors
German male silent film actors
20th-century German male actors